The siege of Halicarnassus was fought between Alexander the Great and the Achaemenid Persian Empire in 334 BC. Alexander, who had no navy, was constantly being threatened by the Persian navy. It continuously attempted to provoke an engagement with Alexander, who would not oblige them. Eventually, the Persian fleet sailed to Halicarnassus, in order to establish a new defense. Ada of Caria, the former queen of Halicarnassus, had been driven from her throne by her younger brother Pixodarus of Caria. When Pixodarus died, Persian King Darius had appointed Orontobates satrap of Caria, which included Halicarnassus in its jurisdiction. On the arrival of Alexander in 334 BC, Ada, who was in possession of the fortress of Alinda, surrendered the fortress to him.

Orontobates and Memnon of Rhodes entrenched themselves in Halicarnassus. Alexander had sent spies to meet with dissidents inside the city, who had promised to open the gates and allow Alexander to enter. When his spies arrived, however, the dissidents were nowhere to be found. A small battle resulted, and Alexander's army managed to break through the city walls. Memnon, however, now deployed his catapults, and Alexander's army fell back. Memnon then deployed his infantry, and shortly before Alexander would have received his first defeat, his infantry managed to break through the city walls, surprising the Persian forces. Memnon, realizing the city was lost, set fire to it and withdrew with his army. Strong winds caused the fire to destroy much of the city.

Alexander committed the government of Caria to Ada; and she, in turn, formally adopted Alexander as her son, ensuring that the rule of Caria passed unconditionally to him upon her eventual death. During her husband's tenure as satrap, Ada had been loved by the people of Caria. By putting Ada, who felt very favorably towards Alexander, on the throne, he ensured that the government of Caria, as well as its people, remained loyal to him.

Sources
Cartledge, Paul. Alexander the Great: The Hunt for a New Past. Woodstock, NY; New York: The Overlook Press, 2004 (hardcover); London: PanMacmillan, 2004 (hardcover); New York: Vintage, 2005 (paperback).

Halicarnassus
Halicarnassus
334 BC
History of Muğla Province
330s BC conflicts
Bodrum
Halicarnassus